Måndalen or Voll is a village in Rauma Municipality in Møre og Romsdal county, Norway. The European route E136 highway goes through Voll, connecting it to the village of Vågstranda [ to the north] and the village of Innfjorden [ to the southeast].

The central part of the village is often referred to as Voll while the larger area in the valley is known as Måndalen.

Måndalen was the administrative centre of the former municipality of Voll from 1874 until 1964. Voll Church is located in this village, and it serves the people of western Rauma.

References

Villages in Møre og Romsdal
Rauma, Norway